AVF may refer to:

Afrikaner Volksfront, a South African separatist organization
Auckland volcanic field, a volcanic field in New Zealand
Australian Volleyball Federation
Arteriovenous fistula, a connection between an artery and a vein
Association for Vertical Farming
AV Formula, a Spanish racing team created by Adrián Vallés

aVF may refer to:
The augmented vector foot (aVF) lead, a voltage difference in electrocardiography